Nightingales & Bombers is an album released in 1975 by Manfred Mann's Earth Band.

"The title of this album was inspired by a recording made in Surrey, England during the Second World War, by an ornithologist intending to record nightingales. The bombers flew over at the same time and were recorded by accident. The recording has been incorporated in 'As Above, So Below'". - Manfred Mann 1975  

The recording was made on 19 May 1942 by a sound engineer for the BBC. Intending to capture the nightingale's song he also, by accident, recorded the sound of RAF bombers on their way to attack Mannheim, Germany. In that raid 197 planes were dispatched and 12 were lost.

Track listing

Side one
 "Spirits in the Night" (Bruce Springsteen) – 6:29
 "Countdown" (Manfred Mann) – 3:05
 "Time Is Right" (Mann, Chris Slade, Mick Rogers) – 6:32
 "Crossfade" (Manfred Mann, Chris Slade, Mick Rogers, Colin Pattenden) – 3:38

Side two
 "Visionary Mountains" (Pam Nestor, Joan Armatrading) – 5:38
 "Nightingales and Bombers" (Mick Rogers) – 4:45(*)
 "Fat Nelly" (Manfred Mann, Peter Thomas) – 3:20
 "As Above So Below" (Recorded Live) (Manfred Mann, Chris Slade, Mick Rogers, Colin Pattenden) – 4:16

Bonus tracks on 1999 CD re-issue
 "Quit Your Low Down Ways" (from US Release) (Bob Dylan) – 3:25
 "Spirits in the Night" (single version) (Bruce Springsteen) – 3:17

(*) The US version of the album includes "Quit Your Low Down Ways" as the second track on side two, which was not part of the original UK album. This song was recorded at the behest of the US record label, who were concerned that the album didn't contain enough songs with vocals (on the original UK LP, every second track is an instrumental, aside from one faintly heard line in the title track and some backing vocals on "As Above So Below").

"As Above So Below" is edited from a jam session that the band played in the middle of a 16-minute live version of "Mighty Quinn", recorded at the Marquee in London on December 18, 1973. This recording was then overdubbed with sound effects such as the aforementioned nightingales and bombers and reversed female vocals.

Personnel

The Earth Band
 Manfred Mann – Hammond organ, synthesisers
 Mick Rogers – guitars, vocals
 Colin Pattenden – bass
 Chris Slade – drums, percussion

Additional musicians
 Ruby James, Doreen Chanter, Martha Smith – backing vocals
 David Millman – viola
 Chris Warren-Green – violin
 Nigel Warren-Green – cello
 Graham Elliott – cello
 David Boswell-Brown – cello

Technical
 Manfred Mann's Earth Band – producers
 Laurence Latham – engineer
 Lilian Bron – photography
 Dave Field – sleeve

Notes

External links
 Manfred Mann's Earth Band - Nightingales & Bombers (1975) album releases & credits at Discogs
 Manfred Mann's Earth Band - Nightingales & Bombers (1975) album credits & user reviews at ProgArchives.com
 Manfred Mann's Earth Band - Nightingales & Bombers (1975) album to be listened on Spotify

Manfred Mann's Earth Band albums
1975 albums
Bronze Records albums
Warner Records albums